Octopine is a derivative of the amino acids arginine and alanine. It was the first member of the class of chemical compounds known as opines to be discovered.  Octopine gets its name from Octopus octopodia from which it was first isolated in 1927.

Octopine has been isolated from the muscle tissue of invertebrates such as octopus, Pecten maximus and Sipunculus nudus where it functions as an analog of lactic acid.  Plants may also produce this compound after infection by Agrobacterium tumifaciens and transfer of the octopine synthesis gene from the bacterium to the plant. 

Octopine is formed by reductive condensation of pyruvic acid and arginine through the action of the NADH-dependent enzyme octopine dehydrogenase (ODH).  The reaction is reversible so that pyruvic acid and arginine can be regenerated.

References

Amino acid derivatives
Dicarboxylic acids
Guanidines